San Rafael is a district of the Montes de Oca canton, in the San José province of Costa Rica.

Geography 
San Rafael has an area of  km² and an elevation of  metres.

Locations
Barrios (neighborhoods): Alameda, Andrómeda, Begonia, Cuesta Grande (part), El Cristo (parte), Estéfana (part), Europa, Liburgia, Mansiones (part), Maruz, Salitrillos

Demographics 

For the 2011 census, San Rafael had a population of  inhabitants.

Economy 
One of its main economic activities is the plantation of cypress, used as Christmas trees in Costa Rica. Along with its immediate neighbors San Ramón District and Mata de Plátano District, it forms one of the main cypress production areas in all the Costa Rican Central Region.

Transportation

Road transportation 
The district is covered by the following road routes:
 National Route 202
 National Route 203
 National Route 306

References 

Districts of San José Province
Populated places in San José Province